Legal Drug Money is the debut album by hip hop group Lost Boyz, featuring members Mr. Cheeks, Freaky Tah, DJ Spigg Nice and Pretty Lou. The album, released on June 4, 1996, features five hit singles: "Renee", "Music Makes Me High", "Jeeps, Lex Coups, Bimaz & Benz", "Get Up" and "Lifestyles of the Rich & Shameless". The album sold well, peaking at number 6 on the Billboard 200 and number 1 on the Top R&B/Hip Hop Albums. It was certified Gold by the RIAA on August 7, 1996.

Track listing

Charts

Weekly charts

Year-end charts

Certifications

Singles

See also
List of number-one R&B albums of 1996 (U.S.)

References

1996 debut albums
Albums produced by Easy Mo Bee
Albums produced by Pete Rock
Lost Boyz albums